Olof Persson Stille (1610–1684) was a pioneer settler of New Sweden, a colony along the lower reaches of the Delaware River in North America claimed by Sweden from 1638 to 1655. Stille served as the first chief justice of the Upland Court, the governing body of the New Sweden colony following Dutch West India Company annexation from Swedish colonial rule.

Background
Olof Persson Stille was born in Sweden on the island of SoIö in Roslagen, northeast of Stockholm, the son of Per Stille, supervisor of the Penningby estate in Länna parish, Norrtälje Municipality in Uppland, north of Stockholm. In 1627 when Per Stille retired, he  was granted land by the owners of Penningby on a nearby island called Humblö in the Stockholm archipelago. This was where Olof Stille married and began his family.

New Sweden
In May 1641, the Charitas departed for New Sweden. The passengers included Olof Stille, a millwright, with his wife, a daughter, Ella, and son Anders. Also on board were Olof's younger brother Axel Stille and the family of Måns Svensson Lom, whose wife appears to have been Olof's younger sister.

In New Sweden, Olof Stille settled at a place located between present Crum Creek and Ridley Creek. The property of Stille was at the mouth of Ridley Creek, now Eddystone, Pennsylvania. Local Indians became acquainted with Olof Stille. They considered his heavy, black beard unusual conferring the name Tequirassy on him because of it.

Stille became a leader among the settlers and played a key role in promoting the July 1653 list of grievances, which was submitted to Governor Johan Printz, protesting his strict rule. Printz considered this action mutiny and subsequently returned to Sweden. Stille was unapologetic about his role in submitting the list of grievances, and when the new governor, Johan Risingh, raised unresolved questions about the "rebellion," Stille posted bail and demanded to be tried according to the law, though Risingh chose to let the matter drop.

Upland Court
After the surrender of New Sweden to the Dutch West India Company, Governor Peter Stuyvesant agreed to allow the Swedish colonists living north of the Christina River to govern themselves as the "Swedish Nation." While Governor Risingh and some of his followers returned to Sweden, most of the colonists remained. Stuyvesant agreed that the colonists would be governed by a court with magistrates of their choosing, could exercise freedom of religion, would organize their own militia and choose officers, would be allowed continued trade with Indians and retain their landholdings, in return for pledging their loyalty to New Netherland. On August 4, 1656, the "Swedish Nation" was formally recognized with a ceremony at Ft. Christina and four magistrates of the newly created court were recognized: Olof Stille, along with Mats Hansson, Peter Cock and Peter Gunnarsson Rambo.

Olof Stille served as the chief justice of this Upland Court at Chester in Delaware County, Pennsylvania, until his retirement in 1664. During that time there were many policy clashes as well as demands made by the Dutch on the Swedish colonists.  Stille was credited with being an able defender of the Swedes' position. He was called upon to settle disputes among the colonists even after he had officially retired.

Wolley Stille
Wolley Stille, a house near Chester which was first completed about 1700, was named for Stille, who owned a neighboring property. Wolley Stille is located in Nether Providence Township, Delaware County, Pennsylvania  The house is now in the National Register of Historic Places. Olof Stille moved to Moyamensing (now south Philadelphia)where he died about 1684.

References

Other sources
Myers, Albert Cook Narratives of Early Pennsylvania, West New Jersey and Delaware 1630-1707 (Charles Scribner's Sons, 1912)
Johnson, Amandus   The Swedish Settlements on the Delaware Volume I: Their History and Relation to the Indians, Dutch and English, 1638-1664, (1911)

External links
 Penningby Castle website Swedish
The Upland Court Record
Wolley Stille in Nether Providence Township

Swedish Lutherans
Swedish emigrants to the United States
People from Uppland
People of New Sweden
People of colonial Pennsylvania
People of New Netherland
1610 births
1684 deaths